4077 may refer to:
4077, a standard XNOR gate CMOS integrated circuit
4077th, a fictional U.S. Army hospital in the show M*A*S*H
4077, the postcode for Inala, Queensland, Australia
4077, the postcode for Tolaga Bay, Gisborne Region, New Zealand

See also
 4000 (number)
 5th millennium